Speedway Boulevard (written as Speedway Blvd.) was an American studio-only rock band, who produced one self-titled studio album for Epic Records in 1980. The group was put together with session musicians by legendary bubblegum pop production duo Jeffry Katz and Jerry Kasenetz, who also produced Ram Jam. The band featured Ram Jam live members Dennis Feldman, Glenn Dove, and Gregg Hoffman performing alongside future Dream Theater keyboardist Jordan Rudess, and singer Roy Herring Jr. After their sole self-titled album was a commercial failure, they disbanded. Dennis Feldman later went on to join Balance.

Members
 Dennis Feldman- Bass and vocals
 Glenn Dove- Drums and percusion
 Gregg Hoffman- Guitar and vocals
 Jordan Rudess- Keyboards
 Roy Herring Jr.- Percussion, piano, and vocals

Discography 
 Speedway Boulevard (1980, Epic)

References

Rock music groups from New York (state)
Musical groups established in 1980
Year of disestablishment missing